Pommern is the German language name for Pomerania, a historical region divided between Germany and Poland.

Pommern may also refer to:

 Pommern (horse), a racehorse which won the English Triple Crown in 1915
 Pommern (ship), former German Flying P-Liner sailing ship, docked in Finland as museum ship
 Pommern, Rhineland-Palatinate, a municipality in the district of Cochem-Zell
 Mecklenburg-Vorpommern or Mecklenburg-Western Pomerania, a German state, partially covering Western Pomerania
 SMS Pommern, German World War I battleship
 Swedish Pomerania, a Dominion under the Swedish Crown from 1630 to 1815, situated on what is now the Baltic coast of Germany and Poland

See also
 Pomeranian (dog)